David J. Wolpe (born 1958) is the Max Webb Senior Rabbi of Sinai Temple. He previously taught at the Jewish Theological Seminary of America in New York, the American Jewish University in Los Angeles, Hunter College, and UCLA.

Wolpe became the focus of international controversy when he gave a Passover sermon that questioned the historicity of the Exodus from Egypt. Ordained by the Jewish Theological Seminary of America in New York in 1987, Wolpe is a leader in Conservative Judaism.

Career
Wolpe has taught at the Jewish Theological Seminary of America in New York, and served as assistant to the Chancellor of that institution; at the University of Judaism (now the American Jewish University) in Los Angeles; and at Hunter College in New York. He frequently is featured on documentaries on Biblical topics produced by A&E Networks (A&E, The Biography Channel, History Channel and History Channel International). Wolpe has written a regular weekly column for the New York Jewish Week for almost 25 years. Wolpe's book, Why Faith Matters, is both an answer to books about atheism and a recounting of his battle with illness (he has undergone two surgeries for a brain tumor and chemotherapy for lymphoma). He has had public debates with Christopher Hitchens, Sam Harris, Steven Pinker, Roger Cohen, Richard Dawkins, Matt Ridley, Bishop Barron, and Indian yogi and mystic Sadhguru, among others. Wolpe is the model for Jacob Kappelmacher, the rabbi detective in J. M. Appel's best-selling mystery novel, Wedding Wipeout (2012).<ref>Encyclopedia of Jewish Fiction (rev. 2014), Pp. 34-5</ref>

Wolpe is the Max Webb Senior Rabbi of Sinai Temple.

Wolpe's work has been profiled in the New York Times, and he is a columnist for Time.com, he regularly writes for many publications, including The LA Times, the Washington Post's On Faith website, The Huffington Post, and the New York Jewish Week. He has been on television numerous times, including the Today Show, Face the Nation, ABC this Morning, and CBS This Morning. In addition, Wolpe has been featured in series on PBS, A&E, the History channel, and the Discovery channel. Wolpe is the author of eight books, including the national bestseller Making Loss Matter: Creating Meaning in Difficult Times. Wolpe's new book is titled David: The Divided Heart. It was a finalist for the National Jewish Book Award (2014), and has been optioned for a movie by Warner Bros.

Missions to Israel
Wolpe has led numerous missions to Israel. The first, in June 2002, was a solidarity mission at the height of the Second Intifada that broke out after the Camp David peace talks. The second, in May 2005, was a mission of gratitude to pick up the Torah commissioned in honor of his recovery from brain surgery. The third, in July 2006, at the height of the 2006 Israel-Hezbollah War, was another solidarity mission that covered Jerusalem, Haifa, and Sderot. In the midst of the second intifada, Wolpe raised three million dollars for victims of terror in a single morning at his synagogue. Wolpe also led the largest American Israel Public Affairs Committee (AIPAC) delegation ever assembled from one synagogue to the AIPAC conference in Washington in 2008, 2009, 2010, 2011, and 2012 with numbers ranging from 230 to 300 delegates. Wolpe also traveled to Haiti to help his friend Mitch Albom (Tuesdays with Morrie) rebuild an orphanage.

Historicity of the Exodus

On Passover 2001, Wolpe told his congregation that "the way the Bible describes the Exodus is not the way it happened, if it happened at all." Casting doubt on the historicity of the Exodus during the holiday that commemorates it brought condemnation from congregants and several rabbis (especially Orthodox Rabbis). The ensuing theological debate included whole issues of Jewish newspapers such as The Jewish Journal of Greater Los Angeles and editorials in The Jerusalem Post, as well as an article in the Los Angeles Times. Critics asserted that Wolpe was attacking Jewish oral history, the significance of Passover and even the First Commandment. Orthodox Rabbi Ari Hier wrote that "Rabbi Wolpe has chosen Aristotle over Maimonides, theories and scientific method over facts". Wolpe, on the other hand, was defended by Reform Rabbi Steven Leder from the Wilshire Boulevard Temple, who argued that "defending a rabbi in the 21st century for saying the Exodus story isn't factual is like defending him for saying the earth isn't flat. It's neither new nor shocking to most of us that the earth is round or that the Torah isn't a history book dictated to Moses by God on Mount Sinai."

Wolpe asserted that he was arguing that the historicity of the events should not matter, since he believes faith is not determined by the same criteria as empirical truth. Wolpe argues that his views are based on the fact that no archeological digs have produced evidence of the Jews wandering the Sinai Desert for forty years, and that excavations in Israel consistently show settlement patterns at variance with the Biblical account of a sudden influx of Jews from Egypt.

In March 2010, Wolpe expounded on his views saying that it was possible that a small group of people left Egypt, came to Canaan, and influenced the native Canaanites with their traditions. This opinion is, in fact, shared by the majority of historians and biblical scholars. He added that the controversy of 2001 stemmed from the fact that Conservative Jewish congregations have been slow to accept and embrace biblical criticism. Conservative rabbis, on the other hand, are taught biblical criticism in rabbinical school.

Personal life
Wolpe's brother is the bioethicist Paul Root Wolpe.

Wolpe is a committed vegetarian. Rob Eshman suggests that Wolpe "leans vegan". Wolpe serves on the Rabbinic Council of Jewish Vegetarians of North America.

Published works
 The Healer of Shattered Hearts: A Jewish View of God (1991). .
 In Speech and In Silence: The Jewish Quest for God (1992). .
 Teaching your Children About God: A Modern Jewish Approach (1995). . Wolpe believes that nurturing children spiritually leads to greater intellectual and emotional enlightenment.
 Why be Jewish? (1995). .
 Making Loss Matter: Creating Meaning in Difficult Times (1999). . Wolpe recognizes the ultimate human potential to find strength from loss. He tells stories from his own life in addition to relaying lessons from ancient stories, rabbis, poets, philosophers, and scholars.
 Floating Takes Faith: Ancient Wisdom for a Modern World'' (2004). . This collection of essays, explores some of the most challenging questions for the modern Jew. It considers how Jews live today and how ancient Jewish values shape the contemporary Jew's understanding of his place in the modern world.
 Why Faith Matters (2009). . Rabbi Wolpe blends the powerful personal story of his struggles with his own faith with a poignant response to the new atheists that reveals just how important faith is in modern society.
 David: The Divided Heart (2014). . Of all the figures in the Bible, David arguably stands out as the most perplexing and enigmatic. He was many things: a warrior who subdued Goliath and the Philistines; a king who united a nation; a poet who created beautiful, sensitive verse; a loyal servant of God who proposed the great Temple and founded the Messianic line; a schemer, deceiver, and adulterer who freely indulged his very human appetites.

References

Bibliography

External links
America's Top 50 Rabbis for 2012 The Daily Beast (2012)
50 most influential Jews in the world: Complete list The Jerusalem Post (2012)
Covenental Judaism Jewish Journal of Greater Los Angeles (2005)
CNN Interview November 1, 2001
PBS Interview on the Afterlife
 Sinai Temple webpage
Exodus Controversy
Orthodox critique
David Wolpe: Gems of Compressed Wisdom, Jewish Current Issues
 Wolpe's author profile
 

1958 births
Jack M. Barrack Hebrew Academy alumni
American Conservative rabbis
Jewish American writers
Jewish Theological Seminary of America semikhah recipients
Living people
Philosophers of Judaism
20th-century American rabbis
21st-century American rabbis